Brimsdown Power Station was a coal-fired power station on the Lee Navigation at Brimsdown in Middlesex. The station had seven cooling towers which were visible from a wide area.

History
The first station was brought into operation by the North Metropolitan Electric Power Supply Co. between 1904 and 1907, before officially opening in 1907. It was used primarily to supply the local tramways. The station was extended between 1924 and 1955, supplying power to the wider area of Enfield and Essex.

Brimsdown Power Station was the only known British example of the Loeffler boiler system. It was a system that enjoyed a brief vogue in the 1930s, mainly in Europe. It overcame metallurgical and feedwater quality problems but rapid advances rendered it unnecessary quite quickly. The Parsons 25 MW turbo-alternator commissioned in 1928 was the first machine in the UK to generate direct at 33 kV.

Coal was supplied by barge or by rail.

In 1948 Britain's electricity supply industry was nationalised under the Electricity Act 1947 and Brimsdown Power Station became part of the British Electricity Authority. The BEA was succeeded by the Central Electricity Authority in 1955 and the Central Electricity Generating Board in 1958. The CEGB decommissioned both stations in 1976.

Technical Specification
In 1959 the A station had two Loeffler boilers, steam capacity of the boilers was 330,000 lb/hr (41.6 kg/s) which supplied one 20 MW and one 31 MW Metropolitan Vickers turbo-alternators. The steam conditions at the turbine stop valve was 1900 psi (131 bar) and 499 °C. The overall thermal efficiency of the A station in 1963-64 was 20.16 per cent.

In 1959 the B station had four Parsons 25 MW turbo-alternators and one Metropolitan Vickers 56.9 MW twin set. By 1963-64 the B station had 1 × 60.27 MW and 1 × 60 MW generators. The steam capacity of the associated boilers was 2,305,000 lb/hr (290.4 kg/s). Steam conditions at the 60.27 MW turbine stop valve was 315 / 900 psi (21.7 / 62.1 bar) and 360  / 399 / 482 °C. Steam conditions at the 60 MW turbine stop valve was 1900 psi (131 bar) and 499 °C. In 1963-64 the overall thermal efficiency of the B station was 23.17 per cent.

There were 5 film cooling towers with a capacity of 6.6 million gallons per hour, and two natural draft reinforced concrete cooling towers each with a capacity of 1.56 million gallons per hour. Water was abstracted from the River Lea.

Electricity output from Brimsdown A and B power stations during their final years of operation was as follows.

Brimsdown A annual electricity output GWh.Brimsdown B annual electricity output GWh.

Enfield Power Station
A 392MW gas-fired CCGT station was opened on a part of the original site in 1999, known as Enfield Power Station or Enfield Energy Centre rather than Brimsdown Power Station. This has been operated by E.ON since 2005. The station [now owned and operated by Uniper] underwent a major upgrade in 2020/21 to increase output to 450MW.

SS Brimsdown
In 1951 the British Electricity Authority named a new "flat-iron" coastal collier SS Brimsdown after the station. However, at 1,837 gross register tonnage,  length,  beam and  draught she was a large coaster, not intended for service on the Lee Navigation.

References

Enfield, London
Coal-fired power stations in England
E.ON
History of the London Borough of Enfield
Buildings and structures in the London Borough of Enfield
Energy infrastructure completed in 1907
Energy infrastructure completed in 1926
Energy infrastructure completed in 1955
1907 establishments in England
1976 disestablishments in England
Former power stations in London
Former power stations in England
Demolished power stations in the United Kingdom
Former coal-fired power stations in the United Kingdom